Norman D. Golden II (born April 7, 1984) is an American former actor best known for his performance in the 1993 film Cop and a Half as Devon Butler. He is also a rapper who goes by the name of Enormus.

Career
In 1992, Golden became a series regular on Fox's True Colors. The sitcom, about an interracial family and their learning to co-exist, was canceled shortly after Golden's arrival in the second season. In 1993, Golden starred in the motion picture Cop and a Half with Burt Reynolds. His last known acting job was a television remake of Moby-Dick in 1998 because he wanted to make a bigger focus on his education.

Currently, he performs as a rapper known as Enormus.

Awards
Golden was nominated for a Young Artist Award in 1992–1993 for Best Actor Under Ten in a Motion Picture.Golden was also nominated for a Razzie Award for Worst New Star.

Filmography
 Moby Dick (TV) – 1998: Little Pip
 America's Dream (TV) – 1996: Aaron
 Sisters (TV) – 1994: Dexter Warren
 On Promised Land (TV) – 1994: Jimmy "Jim Jam" Ween:
 Cop and a Half – 1993: Devon Butler
 There Are No Children Here (TV) – 1993: Pharoah Rivers

External links

Norman D. Golden II on Facebook

Notes

American male child actors
People from Racine, Wisconsin
Male actors from Charlotte, North Carolina
Living people
1984 births
Male actors from Los Angeles
20th-century American male actors
American rappers
21st-century American rappers